Circle-k, Ⓚ, or variant, may refer to:

 A "k" enclosed in a circle, see enclosed alphanumerics
 OK Kosher Certification, a "k" in a circle, found in kosher food packaging
 Kosher certification agency symbol, a mark on foods indicating kosher status from a certification agency
 Kashrut food practice emblem
 Circle K, a convenience store chain
 Circle K Sunkus, a chain of convenience stores in Japan
 Circle K International, a service organization
 Kiwanis, a service club whose logo has a K enclosed in a circle

See also
 K (disambiguation)
 Circle (disambiguation)